Patrick Bourbeillon (24 March 1947 – 13 July 2015) was a French athlete who competed in the 1972 Summer Olympics. He was born in Angers.

References

1947 births
2015 deaths
Sportspeople from Angers
French male sprinters
Olympic athletes of France
Athletes (track and field) at the 1972 Summer Olympics
European Athletics Championships medalists